Portsmouth was a fishing and shipping village located on Portsmouth Island on the Outer Banks in North Carolina, United States.  Portsmouth Island is a tidal island connected, under most conditions, to the northern end of the North Core Banks, across Ocracoke Inlet from the village of Ocracoke. The town lies in Carteret County,  was established in 1753 by the North Carolina Colonial Assembly, and abandoned in 1971. Its remains are now part of the Cape Lookout National Seashore.

History

Ocracoke Inlet was a popular shipping lane during colonial times.  Established in 1753, the town of Portsmouth functioned as a lightering port, where cargo from ocean-going vessels could be transferred to shallow-draft vessels capable of traversing Pamlico and Core Sounds.  Portsmouth grew to a peak population of 685 in 1860.  Though small, Portsmouth was one of the most important points-of-entry along the Atlantic coast in post-Revolutionary America.

In 1846, two strong hurricanes cut Oregon Inlet and deepened the existing Hatteras Inlet to the northeast, making Ocracoke Inlet a less desirable shipping lane by comparison.  The waters around Portsmouth's harbor also began to shoal up, hastening its decline as a port.  The Civil War was yet another blow as many people fled to the mainland when Union soldiers came to occupy the Outer Banks.  Many didn't return after the war had ended and the Village of Portsmouth continued its decline, sped along by the occasional hurricane.  The mammoth 1933 Atlantic hurricane season also served as a benchmark in the island's population decline, though more as a focal point of memory and a symbol of decline than the real cause of it.  (These were the same hurricanes that led to the depopulation of the barrier islands on the Eastern Shore of Virginia and Maryland.)

A further blow was the decommissioning of the US Life-Saving Station there in 1937, and closing of the post office in 1959. In 1967 Portsmouth Island and village had already been acquired by the National Park Service, then incorporated into the new Cape Lookout National Seashore. The last two elderly residents, Marian Gray Babb and Nora Dixon, left the island in 1971 after the death of Henry Pigott, who although approximately the same age was essentially their caretaker.

In 1978 Portsmouth Village was added to the National Register of Historic Places.

Life in Portsmouth
The inhabitants of Portsmouth Village were heavily engaged in fishing and other maritime trades, like piloting and manning vessels, even building a small man-made island, Shell Castle, out of oyster shells for use as a shipping depot. Later many worked as fisherman and clammers. Much of Portsmouth's population was African American descending from the slaves brought to the island. After the Civil War most African Americans left Portsmouth but some families remained including Pigott family whose descendants were some of the island's last inhabitants: Henry and Lizzie Pigott. Under segregation, black and white children could not legally attend the one-room schoolhouse on Portsmouth Island together.  The state never built a separate school for Blacks, so African Americans who remained on the island in its declining years never received the benefits of a formal education.

Inhabitants of the island lived without electricity, running water or refrigeration.

Portsmouth today
Now, 21 total buildings stand, including about a dozen dwellings and a few out-buildings.  These are maintained as part of the Portsmouth Village Historic District.  Of these the Salter House/visitor center, the one-room school, the Methodist Church, the Life-Saving Station, Henry Pigott's house and the Post Office/general store are open to the public during the summer. Now, especially during the summers, people often visit the island and camp out overnight on the beach (camping is not allowed in the village).  Facilities are very limited with a compost toilet near the Life-Saving Station and a restroom in the Salter house/visitors center, with no potable water, food, or electricity available.

Homecoming
Portsmouth is the location of an increasingly well-known "homecoming," currently celebrated every two years.  The island homecoming has its origins in the early trips made back to the island by families who left prior to the 1960s and was originally affiliated with the Methodist and Primitive Baptist churches, primarily out of Cedar Island, North Carolina, where many inhabitants of Portsmouth had resettled.  The homecoming began as a church- and family-based event but has become increasingly a secular celebration of Portsmouth's heritage, under the aegis of the National Park Service.  Many people who have no direct family connection to the island participate in the homecoming.

Access

Portsmouth is reached by a passenger ferry from Ocracoke village.  It is also accessible by four wheel drive vehicles, which cross Core Sound by ferry from Atlantic and use the beach and tracks on North Core Banks.

Portsmouth Island
Portsmouth Island lies to the east of North Core Banks, to which it is connected at most states of the tide.  The limits of the island are not precisely determined and have varied over time. Older maps use the term for the island between Ocracoke Inlet and Whalebone Inlet (which closed in 1961, now the northern end of North Core Banks.)

Climate

According to the Trewartha climate classification system, Portsmouth, North Carolina has a humid subtropical climate with hot and humid summers, cool winters and year-around precipitation (Cfak). Cfak climates are characterized by all months having an average mean temperature > 32.0 °F (> 0.0 °C), at least eight months with an average mean temperature ≥ 50.0 °F (≥ 10.0 °C), at least one month with an average mean temperature ≥ 71.6 °F (≥ 22.0 °C) and no significant precipitation difference between seasons. During the summer months in Portsmouth, a cooling afternoon sea breeze is present on most days, but episodes of extreme heat and humidity can occur with heat index values ≥ 100 °F (≥ 38 °C). Portsmouth is prone to hurricane strikes, particularly during the Atlantic hurricane season which extends from June 1 through November 30, sharply peaking from late August through September. During the winter months, episodes of cold and wind can occur with wind chill values < 15 °F (< -9 °C). The plant hardiness zone in Portsmouth is 8b with an average annual extreme minimum air temperature of 17.5 °F (-8.1 °C). The average seasonal (Dec-Mar) snowfall total is < 2 inches (< 5 cm), and the average annual peak in nor'easter activity is in February.

Ecology

According to the A. W. Kuchler U.S. potential natural vegetation types, Portsmouth, North Carolina would have a dominant vegetation type of Live oak/Sea Oats Uniola paniculata (90) with a dominant vegetation form of Coastal Prairie (20).

References

External links
 
 National Park Service site
A Home Transformed: Narratives of Home, Loss, Longing and the Miniature from Portsmouth Island, North Carolina (M.A. thesis in Folklore, University of North Carolina-Chapel Hill, 2009).  Online resource.
Portsmouth Island Ferry
Google map of the island
Portsmouth Island Vehicle and Passenger Ferry

Outer Banks
Beaches of North Carolina
Ghost towns in North Carolina
Geography of Carteret County, North Carolina
Buildings and structures in Carteret County, North Carolina
National Register of Historic Places in Carteret County, North Carolina
Landforms of Carteret County, North Carolina
Historic districts on the National Register of Historic Places in North Carolina
Populated places on the National Register of Historic Places in North Carolina